S. Narmada (22 September 1942 – 30 March 2007) popularly known as Guru Narmada was a Bharatanatyam exponent and teacher from Karnataka, India. She received several awards including Sangeet Natak Akademi Award, Karnataka Sangeeta Nritya Academy Award, Rajyotsava Prashasti and Shantala Natya Sri Award.

Biography
S. Narmada was born on 22 September 1942 in Bangalore, Karnataka. She received her basic training in dance from V. S. Kaushik. As a prominent disciple of K. P. Kittappa Pillai, she had practiced Tanjavur style of Bharatanatyam under his tutelage for more than two decades. 

An excellent teacher of Bharatanatyam, Narmada started the Shakuntala Dance School in Bangalore in 1978 in memory of her mother, and has trained many nationally recognized dancers. Her disciples include Lakshmi Gopalaswamy, Manju Bhargavi, Sathyanarayan Raju, Nirupama Rajendra, Malathi Iyengar, Praveen and Anuradha Vikranth.

Narmada died of a heart attack in Bangalore on 30 March 2007 at the age of 64.

Awards and honors
 Sangeet Natak Akademi Award 2006
 Karnataka Sangeeta Nritya Academy Award 1998
 Rajyotsava Prashasti 1996
 Best Teacher Award of the Madras Music Academy 1992
 Shantala Natya Sri Award 2001 from the Government of Karnataka
 Bestow Award from the Karnataka Cultural Association, California

References

1942 births
2007 deaths
Performers of Indian classical dance
Indian dance teachers
Bharatanatyam exponents
Artists from Bangalore
Recipients of the Sangeet Natak Akademi Award
Indian female classical dancers
Dancers from Karnataka
20th-century Indian dancers
Teachers of Indian classical dance